The Durrow healthcare consultancy is a partnership run by Andy Black and Ruth Harrison which works mainly in the UK, Scandinavia and Australasia. It specialises in direct management of current health services and radical strategic thinking in complex health economies.  Many of the partners are former Chief Executives of NHS trusts.  They are frequently employed by boards in the English NHS either to supply interim management or to advise on strategic difficulties.

The firm were involved in the development of the new Royal Adelaide Hospital.  They managed the  building of the new Treatment Centre in Kidderminster for Worcestershire Acute Hospitals NHS Trust.  Black says "When I was a Whitehall official under Thatcher and Clarke I dedicated years to destroying NHS Estates and failed".

Harrison was formerly Chief Executive of Buckinghamshire Healthcare NHS Trust which she left the day before the Healthcare Commission reported on problems at the Trust. The inspectors later wrote: "(We) consider there were significant failings on the part of the leadership at the trust and have recommended that the leadership change."  Durrow was later employed by Epsom and St Helier University Hospitals NHS Trust, whose chief executive, Samatha Jones, is related to her by marriage.  The Trust said in response to criticism: "Following a competitive tendering process, specialist health management consultancy Durrow has been hired to manage a review of women's and children's services at Epsom and St Helier Hospitals."

Durrow provided Dorset County Hospital NHS Foundation Trust with a temporary chief executive in 2009/10, Derek Smith, at a cost of more than £2,500 a day, plus almost £20,000 in expenses.  Though the cost of interim executives was criticised the Trust credited them with turning round their financial situation.  The trust predicted a break even in 2011/2012, whereas a £17m deficit had been predicted.

Black has an interest in small rural hospitals.  He told the BBC in September 2014: "If you pursue the centralisation of acute care you end up with a significant proportion of the smaller rural and semi rural hospitals which are deemed non-viable. But the citizens and the voters don't see it that way. So the political pathway to closing that hospital is closed, and the NHS pathway to making it successful is closed."  He says  there is no reason why "gold standard" acute hospital care cannot be cost-effectively delivered from small, well-equipped local hospitals in the future, but that achieving this will require "a number of (current) NHS conventions to be defied".

Wycombe MP Steve Baker commissioned a report from the consultancy in 2014 about the future of Wycombe Hospital at a cost of £8000 from his parliamentary allowance. Their report suggested that the hospital could be used for a "new generation" of casualty unit with an ambulance station integrated into the hospital and could offer GP appointments. Baker was attacked by Linda Derrick, Wycombe Labour's spokesperson on health who said he "should have checked the reputations and credibility of the people who he was paying to provide him with advice on the future of Wycombe hospital."  In response Durrow retorted: "The only thing I would say is millions of pounds have been spent by Labour on management consultants, so they are not adverse to that."

References

External links
 Company website

Private providers of NHS services